Edward Jaykill Phelps (March 3, 1879 – January 31, 1942) was an American professional baseball catcher. He played in Major League Baseball (MLB) for the Pittsburgh Pirates (1902–1904, 1906–1908), Cincinnati Reds (1905–1906), St. Louis Cardinals (1909–1910), and Brooklyn Dodgers (1912–1913).

He helped the Pirates win the 1902 and 1903 National League Pennants and played in the 1903 World Series.

In 11 seasons he played in 633 Games and had 1,832 At Bats, 186 Runs, 460 Hits, 45 Doubles, 20 Triples, 3 Home Runs, 205 RBI, 31 Stolen Bases, 163 Walks, .251 Batting Average, .325 On-base percentage, .302 Slugging Percentage, 554 Total Bases and 60 Sacrifice Hits.

He died in East Greenbush, New York at the age of 62.

Record
 MLB record for consecutive shutouts caught in the modern era - 6

References

Sources

1879 births
1942 deaths
Major League Baseball catchers
Baseball players from New York (state)
Pittsburgh Pirates players
Cincinnati Reds players
St. Louis Cardinals players
Brooklyn Dodgers players
Minor league baseball managers
Danbury Hatters players
Springfield Ponies players
Montreal Royals players
Rochester Bronchos players
Springfield Maroons players
Toronto Maple Leafs (International League) players
Albany Senators players
Sioux City Indians players